Trevor J. Owens (born February 21, 1985) is an American librarian and archivist. He currently serves as the first Head of Digital Content Management at the Library of Congress. He previously served as the Senior Program Officer responsible for the development of the National Digital Platform portfolio at the Institute of Museum and Library Services. Before that, he worked as a Digital Archivist with the National Digital Information Infrastructure and Preservation Program. In 2014 the Society of American Archivists granted him the Archival Innovator Award, presented annually to recognize the archivist, repository, or organization that best exemplifies the “ability to think outside the professional norm.” 

Owens was raised in West Allis, Wisconsin. He studied the History of Science at the University of Wisconsin Madison where he wrote his undergraduate honors thesis on the history of children's books about Albert Einstein and Marie Curie. While studying digital history at George Mason University he was awarded the C. W. Bright Pixel Prize for the Best History and New Media Project. He completed a Ph.D. at George Mason where his doctoral thesis focused on the history of online community software systems. His dissertation work became the basis of his book Designing Online Communities.

Bibliography

References

External links

Living people
American librarians
American archivists
George Mason University alumni
University of Wisconsin–Madison alumni
People from West Allis, Wisconsin
1985 births